Dul-e Mish (also Romanized as Dūl-e Mīsh) is a village in Mishan Rural District, Mahvarmilani District, Mamasani County, Fars Province, Iran. At the 2006 census, its population was 24, in 7 families.

References 

Populated places in Mamasani County